Mook War Cemetery is the final resting place of 322 soldiers killed in the Second World War, situated in the Dutch municipality of Mook en Middelaar. The Commonwealth War Graves Commission is responsible for the cemetery.

It features a Cross of Sacrifice at the cemetery entrance made of Portland stone, with a metal sword. A register and a guest book are present.

The 322 burials are from the following countries:
 United Kingdom – 297
 Poland – 11
 Canada – 10
 Australia – 3
 New Zealand – 1

Nearby Commonwealth War Graves
 Groesbeek Canadian War Cemetery
 Jonkerbos War Cemetery
 Arnhem Oosterbeek War Cemetery

References

External links

 
 

World War II memorials in the Netherlands
Commonwealth War Graves Commission cemeteries in the Netherlands
Cemeteries in the Netherlands
Cemeteries in Limburg (Netherlands)
Mook en Middelaar